1970 Coppa delle Alpi shows the results of the 1970 tournament that was held in Switzerland in the preseason 1970/71. The Coppa delle Alpi (translated as Cup of the Alps) was a football tournament, jointly organized by the Italian Football Federation and the Swiss Football Association as a pre-season event. 

All of the games in the 1970 competition were played in Switzerland. There were four participants from Italy, these being Bari, Fiorentina, Lazio and Sampdoria, 
and there were four from Switzerland: Zürich, Lugano, Young Boys and FC Basel. Each Italian team played against each of the Swiss teams. The Italians and the Swiss each formed their own league table. The winners of each group then matched in the final.

Matches 
Round 1

Round 2

Round 3

Round 4

Final Table Italy

Final Table Switzerland

Final

Sources and References 
 Cup of the Alps 1970 at RSSSF

Cup of the Alps
Alps